Evelyn Rivera Banquett (born 3 December 1997) is a Colombian sprinter. She competed in the women's 100 metres event at the 2016 Summer Olympics.

References

External links
 

1997 births
Living people
Colombian female sprinters
Place of birth missing (living people)
Athletes (track and field) at the 2016 Summer Olympics
Olympic athletes of Colombia
Athletes (track and field) at the 2014 Summer Youth Olympics
Olympic female sprinters
21st-century Colombian women